Arlenis Sierra Cañadilla (born 7 December 1992) is a Cuban professional racing cyclist, who rides for UCI Women's WorldTeam . She rode at the 2015 UCI Track Cycling World Championships.

Major results

Road

2011
 1st  Road race, Pan American Games
2012
 2nd Road race, National Road Championships
 2nd Grand Prix GSB
 5th Overall Vuelta a El Salvador
 7th Grand Prix el Salvador
2013
 1st  Road race, Pan American Road Championships
2014
 1st  Road race, Pan American Road Championships
 National Road Championships
1st  Road race
2nd Time trial
 4th Road race, Central American and Caribbean Games
 8th Overall Tour de San Luis
1st Stage 5
2015
 National Road Championships
1st  Road race
2nd Time trial
 4th Road race, Pan American Games
 4th Road race, Pan American Road Championships
2016
 1st  Road race, National Road Championships
 1st  Overall Tour de Bretagne
1st  Points classification
1st  Young rider classification
1st Stages 1 & 3
 1st  Overall Vuelta Internacional a Costa Rica
1st  Points classification
1st  Mountains classification
1st Stages 2 & 3
 2nd  Road race, Pan American Road Championships
 3rd Overall Tour de San Luis
1st Stage 6
2017
 National Road Championships
1st  Road race
1st  Time trial
 1st  Overall Vuelta Internacional a Costa Rica
1st  Points classification
1st  Mountains classification
1st Prologue, Stages 1 & 3
 2nd Overall Setmana Ciclista Valenciana
1st  Points classification
1st Stage 3
 2nd Trofeo Alfredo Binda
 3rd Overall Tour of California
1st  Sprints classification
1st  Young rider classification
 4th Road race, Pan American Road Championships
 10th Overall Giro d'Italia
2018
 1st  Road race, Pan American Road Championships
 1st  Time trial, Central American and Caribbean Games
 1st Tour of Guangxi
 1st Stage 3 Tour of California
 1st Stage 2 Tour Cycliste Féminin International de l'Ardèche
 2nd Road race, National Road Championships
 2nd Winston-Salem Cycling Classic
 2nd Giro dell'Emilia
 4th Overall Giro della Toscana
 4th Gent–Wevelgem
 5th Drentse Acht van Westerveld
 5th Gran Premio Bruno Beghelli
 7th Ronde van Drenthe
2019
 Pan American Games
1st  Road race
8th Time trial
 National Road Championships
1st  Road race
1st  Time trial
 1st  Overall Giro della Toscana
1st  Points classification
1st Prologue
 1st Cadel Evans Great Ocean Road Race
 2nd Winston-Salem Cycling Classic
 4th Road race, Pan American Road Championships
 4th Tour of Guangxi
 5th Gran Premio Bruno Beghelli
 6th Overall Vuelta a Guatemala
1st Stages 1, 2, 4 & 5
 9th Three Days of Bruges–De Panne
2020
 2nd Cadel Evans Great Ocean Road Race
 3rd Overall Herald Sun Tour
1st  Sprints classification
1st Stage 1
 10th Race Torquay
2021
 1st  Overall Giro della Toscana Int. Femminile – Memorial Michela Fanini
1st  Points classification
1st Prologue & Stage 1
 1st Clasica Navarra
 1st Tre Valli Varesine
 2nd Giro dell'Emilia
 5th Road race, UCI Road World Championships
 6th Scheldeprijs
 6th Durango-Durango Emakumeen Saria
 8th Overall Tour Cycliste Féminin International de l'Ardèche
1st Stage 1
2022
 1st  Road race, Pan American Road Championships
 1st  Overall Vuelta a Andalucia
1st  Points classification
1st Stages 1 & 2
 1st Stage 1 Tour de Romandie
 4th Tour of Flanders
 6th Road race, UCI Road World Championships
 7th Liège–Bastogne–Liège
 9th Dwars door Vlaanderen

Major championship results timeline

Track

2011
 2nd  Points race, Pan American Track Championships
2013
 1st  Team pursuit, Pan American Track Championships
2014
 Central American and Caribbean Games
1st  Team pursuit (with Yudelmis Domínguez, Yumari González and Marlies Mejías)
3rd  Scratch
 Pan American Track Championships
1st  Scratch
2nd  Points race
2015
 1st  Scratch, 2015–16 UCI Track Cycling World Cup, Cali
 Pan American Track Championships
3rd  Points race
3rd  Scratch
2016
 Pan American Track Championships
2nd  Points race
3rd  Scratch
 3rd  Points race, UCI Track Cycling World Championships
2017
 3rd  Team pursuit, Pan American Track Championships
2018
 Central American and Caribbean Games
1st  Team pursuit (with Yudelmis Domínguez, Maylin Sánchez and Marlies Mejías)
1st  Madison (with Yudelmis Domínguez)
2nd  Individual pursuit
3rd  Points race
2019
 3rd  Omnium, Pan American Games

References

External links

 
 

1992 births
Living people
Cuban female cyclists
People from Manzanillo, Cuba
Cyclists at the 2011 Pan American Games
Cyclists at the 2015 Pan American Games
Cyclists at the 2019 Pan American Games
Cyclists at the 2016 Summer Olympics
Cyclists at the 2020 Summer Olympics
Olympic cyclists of Cuba
Pan American Games medalists in cycling
Pan American Games gold medalists for Cuba
Pan American Games bronze medalists for Cuba
Central American and Caribbean Games gold medalists for Cuba
Central American and Caribbean Games silver medalists for Cuba
Central American and Caribbean Games bronze medalists for Cuba
Competitors at the 2014 Central American and Caribbean Games
Competitors at the 2018 Central American and Caribbean Games
Central American and Caribbean Games medalists in cycling
Medalists at the 2011 Pan American Games
Medalists at the 2019 Pan American Games
21st-century Cuban women
20th-century Cuban women